Ragg is a surname. Notable people with the surname include:

Amie Ragg (1878–1957), Fijian engineer, civil servant and politician
David Ragg (1919–2002), Canadian Anglican bishop
Edward Ragg (born 1976), British poet, critic and writer on wine
Harry Ragg (1889–1967), Canadian Anglican bishop
Hugh Ragg (1882–1963), Fijian businessman and politician
Kathlyn Ragg (born 1962), Fijian cyclist
Lonsdale Ragg (1866–1945), British Anglican priest and author